Cole County Courthouse and Jail-Sheriff's House is a historic courthouse, jail and sheriff's residence, located in Jefferson City, Cole County, Missouri. It was built in 1896-1897 and is a three-story, Romanesque Revival style, stone building.  It measures 107 feet by 69 feet and features corner pavilions and a central clock tower.

It was listed on the National Register of Historic Places in 1973. It is located in the Missouri State Capitol Historic District.

References

County courthouses in Missouri
Individually listed contributing properties to historic districts on the National Register in Missouri
Courthouses on the National Register of Historic Places in Missouri
Romanesque Revival architecture in Missouri
Government buildings completed in 1897
Buildings and structures in Jefferson City, Missouri
National Register of Historic Places in Cole County, Missouri